Appointment with Venus is a 1951 film adaptation of the 1951 Jerrard Tickell novel of the same name. It was directed by Ralph Thomas, produced by Betty E. Box and its screenplay was written by the novelist Nicholas Phipps.  The film was based on the evacuation of Alderney cattle from the Channel Island during World War II.

In the United States the film was re-titled Island Rescue.

Plot
In 1940, after the fall of France, the fictitious Channel Island of Armorel is occupied by a small garrison of German troops under the benign command of Hauptmann Weiss. The hereditary ruler, the Suzerain, is away in the British Army, leaving the Provost in charge.

Back in London, the Ministry of Agriculture realise that during the evacuation of the island, Venus, a prize pedigree pregnant cow, was left behind. They petition the War Office to do something urgently due to the value of the cow's bloodline, and Major Morland is assigned the task of rescuing Venus. The Suzerain's sister, Nicola Fallaize, is in Wales, serving as an Auxiliary Territorial Service army cook. She is quickly posted to the War Office so she can tell them about the island. However, when Morland finds out that Venus is practically a member of her family, he obtains permission to ask her to go along. They, radio operator Sergeant Forbes and naval officer "Trawler" Langley, who knows the local waters, are taken to the island by submarine.

They contact the Provost and discover that Weiss, a cattle breeder in civilian life, is about to have the cow shipped to Germany. Nicola persuades her pacifist cousin and painter Lionel Fallaize to disguise another cow as Venus, so they can switch them. Weiss detects the deception, and the chase is on. They are captured by Sergeant Vogel, but manage to overpower him (after Venus gives birth). They spirit the cow and her calf onto a Royal Navy Motor Torpedo Boat which takes them to Britain, sinking a pursuing German E-boat in the process.

Cast

 David Niven as Major Valentine Morland
 Glynis Johns as Volunteer Nicola Fallaize
 George Coulouris as Captain Weiss
 Barry Jones as the Provost
 Kenneth More as Lionel Fallaize
 Noel Purcell as "Trawler" Langley
 Bernard Lee as Brigadier
 Jeremy Spenser as Georges
 Martin Boddey as Sergeant Vogel
 Patric Doonan as Sergeant Forbes
 John Horsley as Naval Officer Kent
 George Benson as Senior clerk
 Richard Wattis as Carruthers
 David Horne as Magistrate
 Philip Stainton as Constable
 Pat Nye as ATS auxiliary
 Nicholas Phipps as Minister
 Derek Blomfield as Admiralty Officer

Basis
The story is based on a real incident told to Tickell after the war by an army officer who had been involved.

The film follows the original novel closely with the exception of the fate of Lionel.

The fictitious island of Armorel may be based on Sark, one of the locations where the film was shot. Sark, inhabited by 500 people, had a feudal ruler, the Seigneur until 2008, as depicted in the play The Dame of Sark. Like all the other Channel Islands, it was occupied by German troops 1940–1945. British commandos made two unsuccessful raids in 1942–43.

Production
The film was based on a novel. Much of the film was shot on the island of Sark. The island did not allow motorised traffic. The filmmakers were allowed one Land Rover and trailer to transport their equipment. Otherwise they had to walk or use boats and horse-drawn carriages. The rushes were transported to the nearby island of Guernsey where they were seen weekly.

Director Ralph Thomas later said they used twelve plain coloured cows to play the lead cow, painting them with a patch on the side. He said this "was a sod because we shot mainly on location, and every time it rained, which it did regularly, the colours would run, and you would think the cow was milking itself because drops of paint were falling on the grass. It was a difficult picture but it was fun."

See also
 Venus fra Vestø, remake about the rescue of a Danish cow named Venus
 Cow (2009 film)

Notes

External links 
 
 Appointment with Venus at Britmovie
 Novel was serialised in the Adelaide Chroniclein 1952–53 – 4 Dec, 11 Dec, 18 Dec, 24 Dec,1 Jan, 8 Jan,15 Jan, 22 Jan, 29 Jan, 5 Feb, 12 Feb, 19 Feb, 26 Feb 12 March, 19 March, 26 March, 2 April

1951 films
1950s war comedy-drama films
British war comedy-drama films
1950s English-language films
Films based on British novels
Films directed by Ralph Thomas
Films scored by Benjamin Frankel
Films shot at Pinewood Studios
Films set in 1940
Films set in the Channel Islands
Films about cattle
British black-and-white films
British World War II films
1951 war films
1950s British films